Benny Schepmans (born 19 December 1953) is a Belgian racing cyclist. He rode in the 1977 Tour de France.

References

External links
 

1953 births
Living people
Belgian male cyclists
Place of birth missing (living people)
Tour de Suisse stage winners